Mezoneuron sumatranum is a leguminous species first described by William Roxburgh.  No subspecies are listed in the Catalogue of Life.  This and a number of similar species are called "cat's claw" lianas: recognisable by raised spines on stems and found in tropical forests of the Indian subcontinent (including Sri Lanka), Indochina, Malesia and Papua New Guinea.

References

External links

Caesalpinieae